Oad Street is a small hamlet in the English county of Kent.

Oad Street forms part of the civil parish of Borden which, in turn, is part of Swale district. Oad Street is located close to Junction 5 of the M2 motorway where it crosses the A249 road.

History
In 1798, Edward Hasted records that this hamlet was once called Hoade Street and Woodstreet, before becoming Oade Street. Named after a nearby Chestnut Wood (which covered the hillside down towards Danaway). In 1653, most of the parish was controlled by William Genery (from Throwley).

Buildings
In the hamlet are 3 listed buildings, Grade II* listed 'Yew Tree Cottage',Grade II listed 'The Olde House', and Grade II listed 'Hoad House'.

Also a local public house, the 'Plough & Harrow' public house.

It also had a former Wesleyan Chapel (Oad Street Methodist Church), now converted into a private residence.

Oad Street food and craft, a restaurant and art gallery.

References

External links

Hamlets in Kent